Skara Brae is a Neolithic settlement in Orkney, Scotland.

Skara Brae may also refer to:

Skara Brae (band), a traditional Irish music group from the 1970s, and their first album
Skara Brae, a town in the Ultima computer role-playing game series
Skara Brae, the main settlement in The Bard's Tale computer role-playing game series